Doug Ithier (born 20 July 1974) is an Australian footballer who played for Perth Glory, Walsall, and throughout Asia including Malaysia, Singapore, Indonesia, and China. Ithier was widely regarded as a tough tackling, no nonsense Defender, who was great in the air and would score long range goals and free-kicks despite playing most of his career as a Centre-back.

Early life
Douglas Edward Ithier was born on 20 July 1974, in Middle Swan, Western Australia, Australia, and is the first son of Douglas Rudolf Ithier (a Mauritius born immigrant) and Mary Thelma Martain (née Ithier). At the age of 2 his mother separated from his father and they moved to a country town of Albany, Western Australia where Ithier played for Yakamia SC and then Albany Primary until moving to Bunbury at the age of 9 to play for Bunbury Tricolore juniors. Supporting Liverpool F.C. from the age of 4, his childhood footballing heroes were John Barnes and Craig Johnston.

Ithier and his single parent mother moved to Bunbury and lived in a rough area of Government State Housing suburb called Withers, Western Australia which is located 350m from the Bunbury Tricolore SC grounds. His young days were spent racing home from school to attend training and it is well known by club officials that Ithier would help with duties around the club that formed his work ethic and strong discipline.

Ithier won individual Fairest and Best awards for every junior team he played for from Under 8's up to Under 16 age groups.

Ithier started playing men's football aged 15 and was playing junior Under 16 age group football on Saturdays and men's 4th team amateur football on Sundays. In 1992 he won the Fairest and Best player for the whole SWSA 2nd Division mens competition as a 15 year old playing in defence as a Sweeper (libero).

From the age of 4 until 17, Ithier played as a Centre-forward scoring goals in all ways and was particularly good in the air heading from set pieces. But he was signed to his first professional contract as a Centre-back after he was told by his Floreat Athena manager Eric Williams when signing that he was a good Striker, but would only make money as a Defender.

Career

Bunbury Tricolore SC

In 1990 at the age of 16 Ithier started his senior career with Bunbury Tricolore SC. In his 3rd year with the club in 1992 he won the WAASSA 1st Division League title and WAASSA Amateur Cup double. He was the clubs youngest ever captain in 1993, was selected in the WAASSA State team and competed in the Australian Amateur Titles – Arafura Games where he was named Western Australia's best player, was voted 3rd best player of the tournament and selected in the 1993 Australian Amateur team.

Floreat Athena

In 1994 Ithier signed with Floreat Athena and was runner up 1994 Rookie of the Year. Dubbed the "Adopted Greek" during his 9 years on and off with Floreat Athena, Ithier was renowned for spectacular long range goals (including one from the halfway line in the 2001 Night Series Final), specialty freekicks, and bone crunching tackles.

As club co-captain, Ithier won the 1996 Floreat Athena Fairest and Best player and was voted 4th Best Player in the WA State League competition which led to Ithier being invited to trial with the newly formed Perth Glory and subsequent signing after 2 weeks impressing then coach Gary Marocchi.

Ithier was able to figure heavily in Athena's TREBLE winning team of 1997 in Perth Glory's off season, regarded as one of Athena's best years, winning the WA State League, Divella Cup and WA Night Series trophies under coach and former Greek legend Jim Pyrgolis. Ithier is one of only five players elevated to "Legend" status as listed on the club's website.

Perth Glory

Ithier played in the inaugural season with the first Perth Glory game held at Perth Oval on 13 October 1996 versus UTS Olympic currently Sydney Olympic FC and despite the team losing the game 1–4, Ithier received the first ever Man-of-the-Match award for his defensive efforts against Kris Trajanovski. In his 2 seasons Ithier being WA born was a cult figure amongst Perth Glory supporters for his flamboyant, aggressive play and changing hairstyles.

Sarawak FA

In 1998 Ithier started his Asian career with 1997 Malaysian Super League champions Sarawak FA with notable players Alistair Edwards and Billy Bone and under the guidance of Alan Vest. In his debut game Ithier won the 1998 Malaysia Charity Shield against Selangor FA in which Sarawak FA won 3–1 with 9 players at a sold out Sarawak Stadium. Playing in the sweeper role Ithier flourished and quickly became a crowd favorite scoring game winning goals like his free-kick against Perlis F.A. Alan Vest once described Ithier as the "Best Header" of the ball in all Malaysia and named him Captain of the side in Billy Bone's absence. Ithier's form in Malaysia earned him the trial with Blackburn Rovers F.C.

Blackburn Rovers F.C.
In 1998, Ithier had a three-week trial with 1994/95 English Premier League Champions Blackburn Rovers F.C. This side, managed by Roy Hodgson, included such players as Chris Sutton, Damien Duff, Colin Hendry and Martin Dahlin. Ithier was refused the relevant work permit however.

Walsall F.C.
Ithier signed to play for the English First Division (now EFL Championship) side Walsall F.C. whilst processing his work permit, and played 3 games but without the European heritage required to play in the English Premier League and not wanting to play lower divisions whilst waiting, Ithier decided to return and focus on plying his trade in Asia.

Marine Castle United

After returning from the UK, Ithier signed with S-League team Marine Castle United for the 1999 season. Ithier will be remembered in Singapore for his Blonde hair and colourfully designed Adidas boots. 

He was selected as one of the best Foreign players and played in the S-League All Stars game. He was again a crowd favorite and constantly surrounded by fans after the game even when the team performed badly, giving autograph's.

Ithier was involved in a life-threatening incident whilst playing against Tanjong Pagar United Football Club. He rose to header a ball from a corner and collided with a player being knocked unconscious. The home side Tanjong Pagar FC did not have an ambulance present, and Ithier was saved by the Marine Castles physio. Tanjong Pagar United Football Club embroiled in controversy was fined by the S-League and the decision resulted in the safety procedures at all clubs to be re-written. Ithier played the following week against doctors advice and was named Man-of-The Match!

Floreat Athena

In 2000 Ithier returned for his second stint with Floreat Athena winning the 2000 Night Series final 6-0 versus Inglewood United FC scoring the 3rd goal. In 2001 Floreat Athena finished runner up in the night series despite Ithier scoring a goal from the halfway line in the 2001 Night Series Final),. In 2002 Floreat Athena finished runner up in the WA State League.

Western Knights SC
In 2003 Ithier was recruited by former Floreat Athena teammate Ronnie Campbell and signed with Western Knights SC. Ithier won the 2003 Night Series in his first season with the club and after a strong early season Ithier was attracting interest from Asian sides once more.

Chengdu Wuniu

Ithier signed with Chinese professional football club based in Chengdu, China Chengdu Wuniu F.C. (currently Chengdu Tiancheng F.C.).

The club was known as Chengdu Five Bulls named after their first sponsor, the Five Bulls Cigarette Company and Ithier played alongside former Cameroon National player Joseph N'Do, Brazilian player Milson and many Chinese national team players.

Four games into the season the Chinese Professional league was suspended due to the 2002–2004 SARS outbreak putting Ithier's career on hold as he returned to Perth with fears the outbreak would end the season. The season was renewed after a 6-week break with the team finishing a respectable 6th position.

Western Knights SC
In 2004 Ithier returned to play for Western Knights SC as he decided his future and subsequently won the WA State League and WA Top 5 Cup Double, and finished runner up in the WA Night Series. Towards the end of the 2004 season Ithier damaged his L3/L4 spinal disc in a training session incident, but played out the year choosing to delay the required surgery until the end of the season. Ithier played the 2005 season but suffered in constant back pain and this would be the last season of his career.

WA State Teams

Ithier represented the senior Western Australia team 10 times scoring on 4 occasions from 1996 to 2003, including playing against Red Star Belgrade, the Indonesia national football team, the Singapore national football team, and Sarawak FA in a match played November 1997 in Sarawak Stadium Sarawak in which Ithier impressed the local side who ended signing Ithier 4 months later for the 1998 Malaysian Super League season as a result.

Ithier first represented Western Australia in 1991 as a junior Captaining the WAASSA State U/18's side to go undefeated in its country tour that year.

Hall of Fame
On 17 July 2009 Ithier was officially inducted into the South West Soccer Hall of Fame as a Champion for his recognition in being the first Western Australian country based player to rise through the Amateur junior and senior grades playing with Bunbury Tricolore (currently named Bunbury United) and play professionally for Perth Glory. Ithier's achievement helped create the pathway for many young country based players to follow their careers including Josh Risdon who went on further to represent the Socceroos. Ithier is currently listed as a Club Legend on Bunbury United's website for his achievement's with the club.

In 2021, as part of Floreat Athena's 70th anniversary celebrations, a Dream Team of all past and current players was voted for and Ithier was nominated in the Defender position.

Personal life
Ithier retired from playing in 2005 aged 30 and is currently the CEO/Founder of Ten Squared Trading, Managing Director of Vital Property Group and co-owner of South Perth Cycles in Perth, Western Australia. He has Mauritian ancestry. He is separated and has one son. He is an avid cyclist formerly racing A-Grade in the West Coast Masters (WCMCC) and a golfer playing on single figure handicap.

Ithier continues to support Liverpool F.C. as a lifelong fan and visited Anfield for the first time in 2008 and met his favorite Liverpool F.C. player Steven Gerrard in a 2015 Dubai holiday.

References

1974 births
Living people
Soccer players from Perth, Western Australia
Australian soccer players
Australian expatriate soccer players
National Soccer League (Australia) players
Perth Glory FC players
Floreat Athena FC players
Walsall F.C. players
Expatriate footballers in China
Chengdu Tiancheng F.C. players
Australian expatriate sportspeople in China
Expatriate footballers in Malaysia
Sarawak FA players
Australian expatriate sportspeople in Malaysia
Western Knights SC players
Association football midfielders